The Soekiman Cabinet was an Indonesian cabinet that served from 27 April 1951 until 25 February 1952, when it fell following revelations that it had signed a mutual security Agreement with the United States.

Formation
On 21 March 1951, the Natsir cabinet fell due to loss of political support. Five days later, President Sukarno asked Indonesian National Party (PNI) leader and parliamentary chairman Sartono to form a coalition cabinet, but he admitted failure on 18 April. On the same day, Sukarno asked the chairman of the Masyumi Party party council Soekiman Wirjosandjojo  and PNI chairman Sidik Djojosukarto to try, giving them five days, then an extra three days. Both men agreed that both parties would have same number of seats. However, there was disagreement over the post of prime minister. Eventually the PNI gave in to Soekiman's demand for a Masjumi prime minister providing this was not Natsir, who had held the position in the previous cabinet. Sukarno subsequently suggested Soekiman himself for the role, which he accepted. This led to a disagreement between the Soekiman and Natsir factions within the party, and the Natsir-led Masjumi executive body refused to accept Sidik and Soekiman's suggested composition for the cabinet. As a result, no members of Natsir's faction were appointed.

Composition
The composition of the cabinet was announced on 26 April. Like its predecessor, it was based around a PNI-Masjumi nucleus. However, the Masjumi members were supporters of the Soekiman faction in the party, and the opposing Natsir-led faction criticized the make-up of the new cabinet. Only six members from the previous cabinet were given posts. The composition was as follows:

Cabinet leadership
Prime Minister: Soekiman Wirjosandjojo (Masyumi Party)
Deputy Prime Minister: Suwirjo (Indonesian National Party – PNI)

Cabinet members
Minister of Foreign Affairs: Achmad Subardjo (Masyumi Party)
Minister of Home Affairs: Iskaq Tjokroadisurjo (Indonesian National Party - PNI)
Minister of Defense: Sewaka (PIR)
Minister of Justice: Muhammad Yamin
Minister of Finance: Jusuf Wibisono (Masyumi Party)
Minister of Information: Arnold Mononutu
Minister of Agriculture: Suwarto (PKRI)
Minister of Trade and Industry: Sujono Hadinoto (Indonesian National Party - PNI)
Minister of Transportation: Djuanda Kartawidjaja
Minister of Public Works and Power: Ukar Bratakusumah (Indonesian National Party - PNI)
Minister of Labor: Iskandar Tedjasukmana (Labour Party)
Minister of Social Affairs: Samsuddin (Masyumi Party)
Minister of Education & Culture: Wongsonegoro (PIR)
Minister of Religious Affairs: Wahid Hasyim (Masyumi Party)
Minister of Health: Dr. Johannes Leimena (Parkindo)
Minister of General Affairs: M. A. Pellaupessy (Democratic Fraction)
Minister of Employee Affairs: R. P. Soeroso (Parindra)

Changes
 Sumitro Kolopaking was the original Defense Minister, but refused the appointment and was replaced by Sewaka on 9 May 1951.
On 19 May, the Ministry of Trade and Industry became the Ministry of Economic Affairs. Economics Minister Sujono Hadinoto was dismissed on 16 July and replaced by Wilopo.
Justice Minister Muhammad Yamin resigned on 14 June. General Affairs Minister Pellaupessy was also appointed Minister of Justice ad interim. Mohammad Nasrun was appointed Justice Minister on 20 November.
 A Ministry of Agrarian Affairs was established on 20 November 1951 with Gondokusomo appointed Minister of Agrarian Affairs. However, Gondokusomo died on 6 March 1952 and had not been replaced by the time the cabinet was dissolved.
 While Transport Minister Djuanda was overseas, Public Works and Manpower Minister Ukar Bratakusumah was appointed Minister of Transport ad interim effective from 13 December 1951.

Cabinet program
The cabinet announced a six-point program with a stronger emphasis on public order and with less emphasis on early elections than its predecessor. The program was as follows:
 Take firm measures to guarantee security and order. Reform the organizations that exercise state power.
 Draw up and implement a national prosperity program to improve people's welfare in the short term.
 Complete preparations for a general election to establish a constitutional assembly. Hold this election in the near future. Accelerate the implementation of regional autonomy.
 Pass laws on the recognition of trade unions and on collective agreements.
 Implement a free and active foreign policy aimed at bringing about peace. Implement the Dutch-Indonesian union as a normal international treaty.
 Incorporate Western New Guinea into the Republic of Indonesia at the earliest opportunity.
It also announced end-of-Ramadan bonuses and monthly rice assistance packets for civil servants, and decided to nationalise the Dutch-owned Java Bank (De Javasche Bank), which at the time was Indonesian's circulation bank.

References

Bibliography
 
 

Cabinets of Indonesia
Liberal democracy period in Indonesia
1951 establishments in Indonesia
1952 disestablishments in Indonesia
Cabinets established in 1951
Cabinets disestablished in 1952